Hirams Knob is a mountain located in the Catskill Mountains of New York southeast of Mapledale. Balsam Lake Mountain is located southwest, and Haynes Mountain is located southeast of Hirams Knob.

References

Mountains of Ulster County, New York
Mountains of New York (state)